Terre du Lac is an unincorporated community and census-designated places in St. Francois and Washington counties in the U.S. state of Missouri. It uses zip code 63628, from neighboring Bonne Terre.

The recreational community is built around several man-made lakes and a golf course overlooking the Big River valley to the south.

Demographics

References

External links

Census-designated places in St. Francois County, Missouri
Census-designated places in Missouri
Unincorporated communities in St. Francois County, Missouri
Unincorporated communities in Missouri